Little America was a series of Antarctic exploration bases from 1929 to 1958, located on the Ross Ice Shelf, south of the Bay of Whales.

The coordinates are approximate.

Little America I
The first base in the series was established in January 1929 by Richard Byrd, and was abandoned in 1930.
This was where the film With Byrd at the South Pole (1930), about Byrd's trip to the South Pole, was filmed.

Little America II

This base was briefly set adrift in 1934, but the iceberg fused to the main glacier.

During the 1934–1935 expedition, many souvenir letters were sent from Little America, using a commemorative postage stamp issued by the U.S. government.  The souvenir cancellation operations were conducted under extremely difficult conditions.

In a later expedition to Antarctica, Byrd's expedition spotted Little America's towers still standing, including the Jacobs Wind plant installed in 1933.

Little America III

In 1940 a huge exploration vehicle, the Antarctic Snow Cruiser, was brought to Little America III. Unfortunately, the vehicle was found to have a number of design and technical weaknesses and was little used. Abandoned, it became buried in the snow. It was last rediscovered in 1958, but has subsequently been lost once again, either under the snow, or under the waters of the Southern Ocean.

The site of Little America III was carried to sea in 1963.

Little America IV
Little America IV was established in 1946–1947 as the primary camp for Operation Highjump.  On 2 and 5 December 1946, 166 Seabees sailed from Port Hueneme on the USS Yancey and USS Merrick assigned to Operation Highjump.

Little America V
Little America V served as the American base in the South Polar program in the International Geophysical Year, from July 1, 1957, to December 31, 1958. Little America V was constructed by United States Navy Seabees in the three-month window before the Antarctic winter makes construction nearly impossible. All of Little America V was constructed below the snow line in the ice, with individual living quarters, generator room, cafeteria, and with ramps leading out at one end for tracked vehicles. This type of construction meant that none of those staying in Little America V had to go outdoors in the harsh winter when going from one section to another of the Antarctic town.

The site of Little America V went to sea on Iceberg B-9 in 1987.

See also
 List of Antarctic field camps
Brockton Station
Byrd Station
Dean Cullom Smith
Ellsworth Station
Framheim
Hallett Station
List of Antarctic expeditions
McMurdo Station
Operation Deep Freeze
Palmer Station
Plateau Station
 List of Antarctic research stations
Siple Station
South Pole Station

References

External links
Paper by CE Palmer, RNZAF on Winds at Little America, 1929

Outposts of Antarctica
United States Antarctic Program
Outposts of the Ross Dependency
1929 establishments in Antarctica
1987 disestablishments in Antarctica